AMC Networks International Southern Europe (formerly AMC Networks International Iberia, Chello Multicanal and Multicanal) is a Madrid, Spain-based television company, owned by AMC Networks International.

In April 2010, it closed the purchase of Teuve, the producer and distributor of thematic channels 100% owned by ONO, incorporating new channels into its offer.

They operate channels under 26 channels (11 in HD and 3 in 4K) in Spain, Portugal, France and Italy.

Channels

Spain 
 AMC
 AMC Break (formerly Bio, A&E and Blaze)
 AMC Crime (formerly Crimen+Investigación)
 Dark
 Decasa
 Canal Cocina
 Odisea
 Historia joint venture with The History Channel Iberia
 Canal Hollywood 
 Canal Panda 
 Sol Música
 Somos
 Sundance TV (formerly Cinematk)
 XTRM

Portugal 
 AMC
 AMC Break (formerly Bio, A&E and Blaze)
 AMC Crime (formerly Crime+Investigation)
 Biggs (joint venture with NOS)
 Canal Hollywood  (joint venture with NOS)
 Casa e Cozinha  (joint venture with NOS)
 História joint venture with The History Channel Iberia
 Canal Panda  (joint venture with NOS)
 Odisseia
 SundanceTV

France 
SundanceTV
Extreme Sports Channel
Canal Hollywood

Logos

External links
Official AMC Networks International Southern Europe
Official AMC Networks International website

AMC Networks
Southern Europe
Mass media companies of Spain
Companies based in Madrid
Mass media in Madrid
Television stations in the Community of Madrid